Paul Kreppel (born June 20, 1947) is an American actor and director. On television, he was best known as pianist Sonny Mann on the show It's a Living. In his work as theater director-producer-creator, he received the 2007 Tony Award for Jay Johnson: The Two and Only.

Early theater career
Kreppel was born in Kingston, New York to Adele and Irv Kreppel. He then moved to Boston to attend Emerson College and graduated with honors. Kreppel received an Alumni Achievement Award in '93 and is a member of the Class of 1969. From there, he had started his acting career by starring in the improvisational theater group, "The Proposition." When the group, which included Jane Curtin, Josh Mostel, Judith Kahan and Munson Hicks, moved to New York, Kreppel began starring in off-Broadway plays, including Godspell and Tuscaloosa's Calling Me... While appearing at the New York Shakespeare Festival, he notably starred with Meryl Streep in the musical, Alice in Concert, by Elizabeth Swados. Others are Agamemnon (as part of choir) and The Comedy of Errors in the late-1970s.

Television and other work
In 1979, Kreppel moved to Los Angeles to become the memorable waitress-harassing pianist, Sonny Mann, of It's a Living, and starred in all 120 episodes; he also directed some episodes. Kreppel, along with Gail Edwards, Barrie Youngfellow and the late Marian Mercer, were the only four who lasted through the show's network and syndicated runs.

He was a semi-regular celebrity guest on the 1980s versions of the game show Pyramid, and also made celebrity appearances on such other game shows as Hollywood Squares, Win, Lose or Draw, Blackout and The New Liar's Club.

During the 1990s, he returned to theatre and starred in the musical revue of the Allan Sherman song, "Hello Muddah, Hello Fadduh!" In addition, he starred in Jerome Robbins' Broadway on its national tour. In the movie sector, he was the voice of Apollo Blue in Jetsons: The Movie. Kreppel guest starred in and directed other television shows, including appearing as Jackie's dad in That '70s Show. He appeared off Broadway for more than a year in the one-man show My Mother's Italian, My Father's Jewish and I'm in Therapy.

He has served on the Council of Actors' Equity Association and as a board member of the Screen Actors Guild, and is active in arts education as a professional arts educator and as a member of the board of directors of Enrichment Works, a not-for-profit that provides curriculum-based theatre for schools in Southern California.

Recent projects
Kreppel directed and produced with his partner in WetRock Entertainment, Ms. Murphy Cross, Jay Johnson: The Two and Only, for which he won a 2007 Tony Award for best special theatrical event. They are also developing other projects.

Kreppel played the Wizard of Oz during the second national tour of the musical Wicked, from March 7, 2012 to March 10, 2013.

He appeared in the 2021 drag-themed television movie The Bitch Who Stole Christmas. The following year Kreppel joined the cast of the Broadway revival of Into the Woods, understudying the Narrator/Mysterious Man and the Steward. He reprised these roles in the 2023 national tour.

Personal life
Kreppel is divorced with two children.  His children, Will and Molly, are both artists.

Acting credits

References

External links

Rotten Tomatoes profile

1947 births
1940s births
American theatre directors
American male television actors
American male film actors
American television directors
Living people
Emerson College alumni
People from Kingston, New York